This is a list of the main career statistics of professional Ukrainian tennis player Lesia Tsurenko.

Performance timelines

Only main-draw results in WTA Tour, Grand Slam tournaments, Fed Cup/Billie Jean King Cup and Olympic Games are included in win–loss records.

Singles
Current after the 2022 Monterrey Open.

Doubles

WTA career finals

Singles: 6 (4 titles, 2 runner-ups)

ITF finals

Singles: 13 (6 titles, 7 runner–ups)

Doubles: 16 (8 titles, 8 runner–ups)

Best Grand Slam tournament results details

Head-to-head records

Record against top 10 players
Active players are in boldface.

Top-10 wins

Notes

References

Tsurenko, Lesia